Leslie Lam may refer to:

 Leslie Lam (doctor)
 Leslie Lam (table tennis)